Bungku people (Bungku: To Bungku or To Bunggu) are an ethnic group who mostly resides in North Bungku, South Bungku, Central Bungku, and Menui Islands districts di Morowali Regency, in Central Sulawesi province of Indonesia. This ethnic group is divided into several sub-groups, namely Lambatu, Epe, Ro'tua, Reta, and Wowoni. Bungku people have their own language, called Bungku language, which is one of their characteristic and serves as a means of communication between themselves. They generally embrace Islam or Christianity.

Bungku people used to have their own small kingdom, called Bungku Kingdom, which was also called Tambuku or Tombuku Kingdom in Dutch report. The kingdom, along with other small kingdom in the eastern shore of Central Sulawesi, fell under the Dutch Colonial Empire since the middle of 19th century.

See also 
 Bungku, an administrative centre of Morowali Regency
 Bungku language, an Austronesian language, part of the Bungku–Tolaki languages

References 

Ethnic groups in Indonesia
Central Sulawesi